Miyazaki Airplane was an aircraft parts manufacturing company based in Japan's Tochigi Prefecture during World War II. The company owned a factory located in Kanuma, that manufactured parts, including rudders, for the Mitsubishi A6M Zero.  During the war, the firm relocated to Utsunomiya.  Shortly thereafter on July 12, 1945, there was an air raid on the city of Utsunomiya which left 43.7% of the city destroyed.

Ownership and leadership
The company was run by Katsuji Miyazaki (c. 1915 – 18 March 1993), the father of the Studio Ghibli animation studio co-founder Hayao Miyazaki.  During World War II production runs the company was owned by Katsuji's brother.

References

Aviation in Japan
Defunct defense companies of Japan